Revolutionary Tea Party is an album by the Canadian musician Lillian Allen, released in 1986. It won a Juno Award, in the Best Reggae/Calypso Recording category at the Juno Awards of 1986. The album sold around 5,000 copies in its first year of release. Allen subsequently named her band the Revolutionary Tea Party Band.

The album was distributed in the U.S. by Holly Near's Redwood Records.

Production
Allen was backed on the album by the Canadian band the Parachute Club; the band's Billy Bryans produced the album. Lorraine Segato sang on "The Subversives". Allen asked her fans to help fund the album's production, which cost around $25,000.

Critical reception

The Toronto Star called Allen's voice "a keening, irresistable instrument," writing that the tracks "deal with frighteningly recognizable contemporary issues, with Canadians' offensive condescension towards Jamaican immigrants, with rape, the pain of birth and the myriad small, shattering injustices perpetrated against blacks, the underprivileged and women both in this country and in Jamaica." The Kingston Whig-Standard declared that "Allen's poetry is a bracing jolt against complacency."

AllMusic called the album "a masterpiece of conscious female passion." Ms. included Revolutionary Tea Party on its 1991 list of landmark albums of the past 20 years.

Track listing

References

1986 albums
Juno Award-winning albums
Reggae albums by Canadian artists